Sulo Vaattovaara (born 18 February 1967) is a Swedish former footballer who played as a defender. During his club career, Vaattovaara played for Gällivare SK, Hammarby IF, IFK Norrköping and IF Sylvia between 1980 and 1999. He made 6 appearances for the Sweden national team. He also competed in the men's tournament at the 1988 Summer Olympics. Vaattovaara is of Finnish descent.

Honours
IFK Norrköping
 Swedish Champion: 1989
 Svenska Cupen: 1987-88, 1990-91, 1993-94

References

External links

1967 births
Living people
Swedish footballers
Sweden international footballers
Association football defenders
Allsvenskan players
Hammarby Fotboll players
IFK Norrköping players
IF Sylvia players
Olympic footballers of Sweden
Footballers at the 1988 Summer Olympics
Swedish people of Finnish descent